Ali Uras (8 June 1923 – 5 May 2012) was a Turkish basketball player. He competed at the 1952 Summer Olympics. He was also the president of Galatasaray S.K.

References

External links
 

1923 births
2012 deaths
Turkish men's basketball players
Olympic basketball players of Turkey
Basketball players at the 1952 Summer Olympics
People from Sinop, Turkey
Galatasaray S.K. presidents